Jean-Pol Vigneron (5 March 1950 – 24 June 2013) was a Belgian physics professor. Jean-Pol started his career working on semi-conductor physics, however he is best known for his later work on the physics of animal colours, photonic crystals, and naturally occurring optical structures.

In 2007, he was elected a member of the prestigious Royal Academies for Science and the Arts of Belgium, he was also a professor at the Université de Namur and lectured at the University of Ouagadougou in Burkina Faso and in Morocco. A conference in his honour was held in Namur in April 2014.

He is also known for having initiated the Living Light Conference series with the 2009 meeting in San Sebastian (Basque countries, Spain).

References

1950 births
2013 deaths
Belgian physicists
Academic staff of the Université de Namur